The 1996 Summer Olympics torch relay was run from April 27, 1996, until July 19, 1996, prior to the 1996 Summer Olympics in Atlanta. The relay involved over 12,000 torchbearers, including Muhammad Ali, who was chosen to ignite the Olympic cauldron.

Torch

The torch was designed by Malcolm Grear and featured 22 aluminum "reeds" intended to represent the number of times that the Games had been held. A gold-plated band towards the base of the torch features the names of all 20 host cities up to and including Atlanta while the logo is etched into another band near the top. The handle, made of Georgia hardwood by Hillerich & Bradsby Co, maker of Louisville Slugger bats, is found near the center of the  torch. Torchbearers were allowed to purchase for $275 the torch that they had carried.

Route

The initial journey of the Olympic flame always begins in Olympia. The flame then landed at Los Angeles International Airport on April 27, 1996, and was met with a welcome ceremony. The first torchbearer of the American part of the relay, Rafer Johnson, was the final torchbearer at the 1984 Summer Olympics held in Los Angeles. The torch was carried by 12,467 bearers including 2,000 former Olympians or other people somehow linked to the Olympic movement, 5,500 people who had been nominated locally as "community heroes", and 2,500 people picked out in a draw.

The route was designed to take in as many historically and culturally significant locations as possible. The torch was first carried to Santa Monica Pier and was greeted at the first of hundreds of celebratory events. It then proceeded along the coast and up to Kingman, Arizona, at which point it joined the famous Route 66, passing close to the Grand Canyon and reaching Hoover Dam. It was carried across by Martha Watson and the world's largest US flag was unfurled across the wall of the dam.

The route featured a wide variety in the methods of transport used, including bicycles, boats, and trains. From Las Vegas the flame was passed onto a special cauldron car on a Union Pacific train, the first of several train journeys. The National Pony Express Association participated in the journey with riders carrying the torch for over 56 continuous hours. On June 12 the torch was taken on board a replica of a 19th-century packet boat and pulled for  along Erie Canal by mule. The torch was also carried into space for the first time, with astronauts taking an unlit torch with them aboard Space Shuttle Columbia as part of STS-78. This was replicated during the 2000 Summer Olympics torch relay and as part of the 2014 Winter Olympics torch relay.

While the relay went without any major mishaps there was need for a 15-mile diversion on the route between Baton Rouge and New Orleans – a  gasoline spillage in Gramercy, Louisiana, necessitated the detour.

Sponsorship
The relay was sponsored by Coca-Cola with accompanying cars, vans, and trucks emblazoned with the logo. Revenue from the drinks sold from the travelling party were donated to charity. As part of the deal Coca-Cola were allowed to choose a quarter of the relay runners. They gave nomination forms away as part of a promotional deal with 12-packs of their cans with the entries largely being selected at random.

Opening ceremony

The end of the relay took place on July 19, 1996, at the opening ceremony in Atlanta. Four-time gold medal-winning discus thrower Al Oerter carried the torch to the stadium, passing it to Evander Holyfield. Holyfield was then joined by Voula Patoulidou and the pair passed the flame to American swimmer Janet Evans, the penultimate torchbearer, who carried it around a lap of the track and up a long ramp leading towards the northern end of the stadium.

The identity of the final torchbearer had been kept secret and was only revealed when Muhammad Ali appeared at the top of the ramp. Ali, who had won gold at the 1960 Games in Rome and later developed Parkinson's disease, lit a mechanical torch which then travelled along a wire, lighting the cauldron at the top of a  tower. His appearance has been referred to as being one of the most inspiring, poignant, and emotional moments in Olympic history.

References

Torch Relay, 1996 Summer Olympics
Olympic torch relays